State Route 118 (SR 118) is a state highway in the U.S. state of California that runs west to east through Ventura and Los Angeles counties. It travels from State Route 126 at the eastern edge of Ventura immediately northwest of Saticoy, then through Saticoy, in Ventura County east to Interstate 210  near Lake View Terrace in Los Angeles. SR 118 crosses the Santa Susana Pass and the northern rim of the San Fernando Valley along its route.

Route description

SR 118 has two distinguishable sections, which connect at the intersection with State Route 23. The western section of SR 118 goes through the more rural areas of Ventura County. SR 118 begins at an intersection with SR 126 in Ventura as Wells Road and heads southeast, crossing the Santa Clara River as Los Angeles Avenue and intersecting SR 232 in unincorporated Ventura County. The highway continues southeast before intersecting Santa Clara Avenue, where Los Angeles Avenue turns east and passes north of Camarillo. In the community of Somis, SR 118 intersects SR 34. The road continues into Moorpark, where it intersects SR 23 and runs concurrently with that road. After about 1.25 miles, SR 118 and SR 23 come to a freeway interchange, where SR 118 continues north, and SR 23 continues south.

The eastern section is an urban freeway that starts in the cities of Moorpark and Simi Valley, and ends in Los Angeles. The SR 118 freeway initially travels north, but quickly turns east, passing near Moorpark College, before entering the Simi Valley city limits. SR 118 continues through Simi Valley before entering Corriganville Regional Park and crossing into Los Angeles County and the Los Angeles city limits. The freeway has an HOV lane between here and Interstate 5. In Los Angeles, SR 118 passes through Santa Susana Pass State Historic Park before passing through Chatsworth and interchanging with SR 27. SR 118 subsequently goes through Porter Ranch and Granada Hills before intersecting with I-405 and I-5. Following this, SR 118 goes through Pacoima before terminating at an interchange with I-210.

SR 118 is part of the California Freeway and Expressway System, and is part of the National Highway System, a network of highways that are considered essential to the country's economy, defense, and mobility by the Federal Highway Administration. SR 118 is eligible to be included in the State Scenic Highway System, but it is not officially designated as a scenic highway by the California Department of Transportation. The freeway portion of Route 118 between Moorpark and Lake View Terrace was originally named the Simi Valley-San Fernando Valley Freeway before it was designated as the Ronald Reagan Freeway in 1994. It was renamed in honor of Ronald Reagan, the 33rd Governor of California and the 40th President of the United States, due to the location of his presidential library in Simi Valley.

History

SR 118 used to extend past I-210 on Foothill Boulevard through Sunland-Tujunga, La Crescenta and La Cañada, then across the Arroyo Seco into Pasadena, where SR 118 ran on Lincoln Avenue and Fair Oaks Avenue, ending at Colorado Boulevard (US 66 Alternate). The original routing across the Arroyo Seco ran along La Cañada Verdugo Road (now Oak Grove Drive), which crossed the arroyo along the crest of Devil's Gate Dam. In 1957, the first segment of the Foothill Freeway was completed between Montana and Cañada Streets in Pasadena and Foothill Blvd and Michigan Avenue in La Cañada. SR 118 ran along this short freeway until 1974, when the current Foothill Freeway alignment over the Arroyo Seco was completed further to the south. SR 118 was then truncated to its current terminus with I-210 near San Fernando.

Before the freeway was built, the route went through Simi Valley on Los Angeles Avenue and Kuehner Drive, then crossed into the San Fernando Valley on Santa Susana Pass Road. The eastern segment used Devonshire Street through the San Fernando Valley, then cut through San Fernando along Brand and Maclay Streets before joining Foothill Boulevard in Sylmar. During the 1932 Summer Olympics, it hosted part of the road cycling event. The SR 118 freeway began construction in 1968 and the last section of freeway opened in 1979. The segment of freeway between Balboa Boulevard and Tampa Avenue was one of the last freeway segments to be built in the Los Angeles area. As a result of the Northridge earthquake in January 1994, a section of the highway between I-405 and I-210 was closed for over one month while damage to an overpass was repaired. The Porter Ranch Drive interchange is relatively new; before it was constructed, that interchange connected to a closed Winnetka Avenue and a Park and Ride lot.

Route 118 from Route 23 to Route 210 was named the Simi Valley-San Fernando Valley Freeway by Assembly Concurrent Resolution 145, Chapter 185 in 1970. In December 1994, the portion of Route 118 constructed to freeway standards was renamed the Ronald Reagan freeway. The original proposal for this name was introduced by Willie Brown on August 30, 1994 and amended August 31, 1994, as State Assembly Concurrent Resolution 156, however this version of the bill died on the desk in November 1994. The name was reintroduced by State Senators Lockyer, Maddy, and Wright as State Senate Resolution 7, amended and enrolled December 5, 1994. Since it was neither a concurrent resolution nor a joint resolution, it was not filed with the Secretary of State. The rationale for choosing this name for State Route 118 is that the western end of the highway, at the time the bill was passed, is very close to the Ronald Reagan Presidential Library.

There is an additional unconstructed segment of SR 118, defined in 1959 in the California Streets and Highways Code, extending from its current terminus with I-210 to a planned SR 249, located within the Angeles National Forest. This appears to have been roughly planned to run primarily along Big Tujunga Canyon between Foothill Boulevard and Los Angeles County Route N3, Angeles Forest Highway, which is the current traversable routing for unconstructed SR 249.

Major intersections

See also

References

External links

California @ AARoads.com - State Route 118
Caltrans: Route 118 highway conditions
California highways: Route 118

118
118
State Route 118
State Route 118
Transportation in the San Fernando Valley
Transportation in Simi Valley, California
Chatsworth, Los Angeles
Mission Hills, Los Angeles
Moorpark, California
Porter Ranch, Los Angeles
Olympic cycling venues
Venues of the 1932 Summer Olympics